Television's Greatest Hits is a series of albums containing recordings of TV theme songs through the years. The series was first introduced in 1985 by the then-new TVT Records. Each of the original 8 volumes contains 65 theme songs. Another TVT volume, All-Time Top 100 TV Themes, was issued in 2005. As of September 2011, Oglio Records was re-issuing the tracks in a series of nine compilations.

History

TVT Records
TVT Records was launched in 1985 with the release of Television's Greatest Hits''' first issue, the double LP compilation 65 TV Themes! From the 50's and The 60's. The album featured theme songs from classic TV shows, and it became a respectable seller. The San Francisco Chronicle called the album "the most fun you can have with your pants on", and the New York Times highlighted it as one of 1985's most notable business ideas. It featured 65 themes from television shows ranging from the mid-1950s until the late 1960s, including tracks from The Bugs Bunny Show, Popeye, The Dick Van Dyke Show, I Love Lucy, The Twilight Zone, and many others.

The second volume, 65 More TV Themes From The 50s & 60s, was released in 1986, and included themes from Mister Rogers' Neighborhood, Mighty Mouse Playhouse, Merrie Melodies, I Spy, Monty Python's Flying Circus. 70's and 80's, the third volume, was released in 1987. The fourth volume in 1989, The Commercials, included a number of jingles ad commercials from different eras. According to a review in Allmusic, "Upon first hearing these jingles, listeners will be amazed to find themselves singing along spontaneously, and surprised at how they come back to full consciousness in spite of not having been heard [most of them] for decades. That said, it's great fun to hear most of these commercials dealing with food, cigarettes, household cleaners, beer, cars, and soft drinks, among other products." The series then went on hiatus, with TVT returning it in 1996 with Black and White Classics, and releasing three more volumes in prompt succession that year. The format of the original eight-volume series became widely imitated by other record labels.

The catalog was later acquired by The Bicycle Music Company, an independent publisher and rights holder that has acquired catalog rights to musicians such as Nine Inch Nails, Cyndi Lauper, Pete Seeger, Third Eye Blind, Arlo Guthrie, and Sublime.

Oglio Records Reissues
In September 2011, Los Angeles-based Oglio Records announced they were releasing the  Television's Greatest Hits song catalog after entering into an arrangement with The Bicycle Music Company. Starting in September 2011, Oglio began releasing television themes bundled into "6-packs," starting with Classic Sitcoms and with announced 2011 releases for eight more volumes such as Cop Shows, Adventure, Detective Shows, and Classic Comedy. Oglio has distribution agreements with INgrooves, Fontana, and Universal.

Discography
TVT series

Oglio series

 References 

External linksTelevision's Greatest Hits'' at Oglio Records

Compilation album series
TVT Records compilation albums